Rowing Through is a Canadian-Japanese co-produced drama film, directed by Masato Harada and released in 1996. Based on David Halberstam's book The Amateurs, the film centres on American sculler Tiff Wood as he tries to qualify for the 1984 Summer Olympics.

The film stars Colin Ferguson as Wood, Leslie Hope as Kate Bordeleau, Peter Murnik as John Biglow and James Hyndman as Polar Bear Nelson, as well as Helen Shaver, Kenneth Welsh, Christopher Heyerdahl, Kris Holden-Ried and Ellen David.

The film received two Genie Award nominations at the 17th Genie Awards in 1996, for Best Supporting Actor (Hyndman) and Best Cinematography (Sylvain Brault).

Home media
The film was released on DVD on June 19, 2001 by Vanguard Cinema.

References

External links

1996 films
1990s sports drama films
Canadian sports drama films
Japanese sports drama films
1996 drama films
English-language Canadian films
English-language Japanese films
1990s English-language films
Films directed by Masato Harada
1990s Canadian films
1990s Japanese films